Filipino singer and songwriter Jay R has released six studio albums, one compilation album and thirty-eight singles. In 2003, Jay R released his debut album entitled Gameface which was certified Platinum by Philippine Association of the Record Industry (PARI), selling more than 30,000 units in the Philippines. The album was accompanied by the release his debut single, "Design for Luv," which received heavy airplay but did not perform well enough to be a breakthrough hit. Following the first single, he released a Tagalog ballad, "Bakit Pa Ba," written by legendary Filipino composer Vehnee Saturno. The song became his biggest hit to date, peaking at number one on the Philippine charts and earning him a MTV Pilipinas Award for  Favorite Male Video in 2004. The following singles, "Kung Mahal Mo Siya" and "Throw Your Hands in the Air" (Remix), were released to further promote the album.

In December 2005, Jay R released an upbeat R&B version of Billy Joel's "Just the Way You Are" as lead single, accompanying his self-titled second album. The album received positive reviews from music critics with Titik Pilipino stating, "I can't find a bad word for Jay R- the artist and the album." The first single was followed by another Tagalog ballad, also written by Saturno, entitled "Ngayo'y Narito." Jay R and its two singles did not perform as well as his previous releases. It was until his 2008 cover album, Soul in Love, that he regained his commercial success as a Platinum-selling artist. The album earned him critical acclaim from music reviewers, awards and accolades from major organizations, and another Platinum certification by the PARI. Early in 2010, he released a fan-requested all-Tagalog album, Jay R Sings OPM Love Classics, which was certified Gold in the Philippines in November 2010. In the same year, he went to Indonesia to record a song in Bahasa for a commercial release in the country. To date, Jay R has sold more than 100,000 albums in the Philippines.

Albums

Studio albums

Compilation albums

Re-releases

Singles

As lead artist

As featured artist

Soundtracks

Other appearances

As vocalist

As songwriter

Music videos

References

Discographies of American artists
Discographies of Filipino artists
Rhythm and blues discographies

es:Jay R